The Bottle Yard Studios is a British film and television production studio facility in Bristol, South West England. It is the largest dedicated production space in the West of England.

History
The studios are located on Whitchurch Lane, approximately 4 miles south of Bristol city centre.
In 2010, the site stood unused after operating for more than 50 years as a former winery and bottling plant. At one time it had housed the full production line for Harvey's Bristol Cream Sherry, run by John Harvey & Sons.

The studios opened in 2010 as a partnership initiative with Bristol City Council which owns the studios, transforming the disused industrial space into a busy creative hub for film and TV production.

In its first year, the studios were estimated to have brought in £8 million in investment into the city of Bristol. In 2021, it was credited with helping achieve about a tripling of drama production in Bristol since 2010.

The West of England Combined Authority has invested £11.3 million to open three more stages in 2022, increasing the number of stages to eight.

Productions

 8 Minutes Idle (2012)
 The Adventurer: The Curse of the Midas Box (2014)
 Alex Rider (2023–)
 Am I Being Unreasonable? (2022–)
 Andy's Aquatic Adventures (2020–)
 Andy’s Global Adventures (2023–)
 Andy's Prehistoric Adventures (2016)
 Andy's Safari Adventures (2018–19)
 Art Ninja (2019)
 The Beaker Girls (2021)
 Becoming Elizabeth (2022–)
 Broadchurch (2017)
 Casualty (2011)
 Cheap Cheap Cheap (2017)
 Chloe (2022)
 Crazyhead (2016)
 The Crystal Maze (2017–20)
 Deadly Dinosaurs (2018)
 Deal or No Deal (2013–16)
 Dino Club (2023–)
 Dirk Gently (2010–12)
 Dodger (2023–)
 Eric, Ernie and Me (2017)
 Excluded (2010)
 The Fear (2012)
 The Festival (2018)
 Five Daughters (2010)
 The Flatshare (2023–)
 Fortitude (2018)
 Galavant (2015–16)
 The Girl Before (2021)
 Golden Years (2016)
 Hellboy (2019)
 Hit the Road Jack (2012)
 How (2022–)
 Ill Behaviour (2017)
 In the Dark Half (2012)
 Inside Men (2012)
 The Killing Kind (2024–)
 The Last Bus (2022)
 The Living and the Dead (2016)
 The Long Call (2021–)
 The Lost Honour of Christopher Jefferies (2014)
 The Makery (2022–)
 McDonald & Dodds (2020–)
 The Mimic (2014)
 New Worlds (2014)
 The Outlaws (2021–)
 The Pale Horse (2020)
 Poldark (2015–19)
 Public Enemies (2012)
 The Pursuit of Love (2021)
 Rain Dogs (2023–)
 The Salisbury Poisonings (2020)
 Sandition (2019–)
 Sherlock: The Abominable Bride (2016)
 Showtrial (2021)
 The Spanish Princess (2019–20)
 Three Girls (2017)
 Tipping Point (2018–)
 The Trial of Christine Keeler (2019–20)
 Trollied (2011–18)
 The White Princess (2017)
 Wolf Hall (2015)

References

External links
 "Official site"
 "Filming in Bristol" Bristol City Council. Retrieved 1 October 2014.
 "The Bottle Yard" Bristol Film Office. Retrieved 1 October 2014.
 "The top British film studios" Televisual. Retrieved 1 October 2014.
 "The Bottle Yard Studios – from disused warehouses to Disney" Seenit, 9 July 2014. Retrieved 1 October 2014.
 "The Bottle Yard Studios – Bristol’s international hub of film and TV production" Bristol Culture, 31 July 2014. Retrieved 1 October 2014.
 "Bristol film studio's success story" Bristol Post, 6 June 2014. Retrieved 1 October 2014.
 Ribbeck, Mike. "Profile: The Hollywood of Hengrove – Bristol's Bottle Yard Studio" South West Business, 6 June 2014. Retrieved 1 October 2014.

Television production companies of the United Kingdom
British film studios
Television studios in England
Entertainment companies established in 2010
British companies established in 2010
2010 establishments in England